Games Without Frontiers could refer to: 

Jeux sans frontières, a European television game show
"Games Without Frontiers" (song), a 1980 song by Peter Gabriel
"Games Without Frontiers", a 1980 episode of the British television anthology series BBC2 Playhouse